Beaver Group is an organization whose focus is the delivery of digital signage, content design and web technologies.

Beaver Group clients are spread across the UK and international markets, and include the GlaxoSmithKline, SSP, Center Parcs, Whitbread, Bloomberg, Home Office, IKEA and P&O Cruises.

In 2008 Beaver Group was awarded 'Digital Signage Project of the Year' by the AV Awards for the deployment of digital signage for the Showcase Cinemas de Lux brand in the UK and again in 2010 for a deployment at Burger King in the UK. Twice a winner of the Daily DOOH Gala Awards, and the Marketing Week Engage Award.

Companies 
Graphic designer Alan Critchley worked as a freelance graphic designer for Nabisco (now Cereal Partners  Nestlé cereals) and Rank Xerox, at which time he met Dave Suter. In 1978 Alan and Dave partnered to start a graphic design company called Beaver Design.

In 2001, Beaver Design came together with Managed Information Technologies Limited, run by directors Barry Thurston and Peter Critchley, to form the 'Beaver Group'. Beaver Group is a technology company which specializes in digital signage, design and web technologies, with a range of software for the display of messages to customers. Beaver Group has continued to develop the digital signage industry since 1998, including serving as one of Scala’s premier integrators. Beaver Group operates across various market sectors, including food retail, cinemas, retail and hospitality and corporate. The range of services offered includes consultancy, content design, application development, installation, project management and support. Beaver Group are also fully equipped to provide ongoing and fully managed services.

In late 2008, Beaver Group partnered together with industry leaders in digital signage to create a specific company for digital menu boards - Signature Digital Menus Ltd. Along with Sanyo, Scala, Vogels and Matrox, Signature was a company whose purpose was to provide elements for digital menu boards. Signature Digital Menus offered consultancy services until 2016. 

In 2014, Beaver Group developed a new approach to digital signage implementations, through its software platform, signage.ninja. Recognizing the changing face of digital messaging and the need for contextual content, analytics and data driven content, Beaver Group has successfully deployed signage.ninja across multiple clients, including Ikea and SSP.

Customers 
Beaver Group services a wide range of customers across market sectors.
 GlaxoSmithKline
 IKEA
 Whitbread (Premier Inn, Brewers Fayre, Hub, Costa Coffee)
 Shake Shack
 Showcase Cinemas
 Eat
 SSP
 Center Parcs
 Compass Group
 Canary Wharf
 Curzon Cinemas
 POD
 Odeon Cinemas
 Merlin Entertainments
 PizzaExpress
 Bella Italia
 Bubbleology
 P&O Cruises
 Bupa
 Bloomberg
 PricewaterhouseCoopers
 Daily Mail & General Trust
 Home Office
 Department for Transport
 Virgin Rail Group

See also
Scala, Inc
Digital Signage

References

Presentation software
Software companies of the United Kingdom
Signage companies
Web design
Signage
1978 establishments in England
Software companies established in 1978
British companies established in 1978